Mogoditshane Senior Secondary School  is a government Institution located in Mogoditshane, Kweneng, Botswana. The School is not far from Nkoyaphiri hill.

References

External links 
 Education in Botswana
http://www.dailynews.gov.bw/news-details.php?nid=5941

Schools in Botswana